Richard Patrick Bennett , better known by the stage name Charlie Chaplin, is a Jamaican dancehall and ragga singer and deejay. It was common for Jamaican deejays of the era to name themselves after film stars or characters. Bennett, however, had been nicknamed after the comedian since his youth. His career began in 1980 when he began working with U-Roy's Stur-Gav Hi-Fi collective. He became extremely popular throughout Jamaica, memorable for his focus on cultural and social themes instead of the "slack" (rough, violent) lyrics that were popular at the time. His popularity as a live performer prompted Roy Cousins to produce some recording sessions with the young DJ. Chaplin's debut album was the Cousins-produced Presenting Charlie Chaplin in 1982, with several albums following for the producer over the next three years.

The contrast between Chaplin's "culture" lyrics and the other major deejays of the day led to the 1984 "clash" album with Yellowman Slackness Vs Pure Culture.

Que Dem (1985), was produced by George Phang and he continued recording, working with Bunny Roots, Josey Wales, Sly & Robbie, Henry "Junjo" Lawes, Roots Radics and Doctor Dread.

In 2013, Bennett was awarded the Order of Distinction by the Jamaican government.

Bennett started his own Crown Production label, on which he released his own music. An album, Armageddon, was set for release in Summer 2016.

Discography
Presenting Charlie Chaplin (1982), Kingdom
Red Pond (1982), Tamoki Wambesi
Chaplin Chant, Tamoki Wambesi
One of a Kind (1983), Trojan
Fire Burn Them Below (1984), Power House
Roots & Culture (1984), Vista Sounds
Sound System (1984), Arrival
Que Dem (1985), Sonic Sounds
Quenchie, Tamoki Wambesi
Yellowman Meets Charlie Chaplin, Power House – with Yellowman
Live at Maypen Clarendon (1988), Tamoki Wambesi
Two Sides of Charlie Chaplin (1989), RAS
Take 2 (1990), RAS
Cry Blood (1991), RAS
Old and New Testament (1992), RAS
Kings of the Dancehall (1994), VP – with Josey Wales
Too Hot to Handle (1994), RAS
The Negril Chill (1997), Shellshock – with Yellowman
Gwaan U Ways (2001), P.O.T.
Free Africa, Sonic Sounds

Compilations
20 Super Hits (1991), Sonic Sounds
Dance Hall Rockers, Sunset
Dance Hall Rockers vol. 2, Harry J
Ras Portraits (1997), RAS
Face to Face (2000), Cactus
Respect Due (2000), Creole
DJ Roll Call (2006), RAS
Kings of Reggae, Nocturne

Bibliography
Bradley, Lloyd (2001). This is Reggae. New York: Grove Press.
Chang, Kevin O'Brien and Wayne Chen (1998). Reggae Routes. Philadelphia: Temple University Press.
Weber, Tom and Brian Jahn (1998). Reggae Island: Jamaican Music in the Digital Age. New York: Da Capo Press.

References

External links
Discography at Roots Archives

Jamaican dancehall musicians
Jamaican reggae singers
Jamaican male singers
Jamaican songwriters
Living people
Trojan Records artists
Year of birth missing (living people)